Oisín Gough (born 4 April 1989) is an inter-county senior hurler with Dublin and Cuala.

County hurling
He plays at corner back with his county and club. He made his debut in the National Hurling League against Clare in 2009. He won a Leinster Minor Hurling Championship medal with Dublin in 2007 and a Leinster Senior Hurling championship with Dublin in 2013. He won the Walsh Cup and the National Hurling League with Dublin in 2011.

Underage hurling
He won an All-Ireland Colleges hurling title with Dublin colleges in 2006. He won both the Dublin Minor Football Championship and the Leinster Minor Club Football Championship in 2006 with Cuala.
In 2010 he won the Leinster Under-21 Hurling Championship, with Dublin beating Wexford 2-15 to 0-15.

Personal life
He currently plays senior hurling with Cuala. In 2011 he graduated from University College Dublin with a Bsc in Pharmacology. That same year he also began a PhD in Clinical and Translational Research.

References

1989 births
Living people
Dublin inter-county hurlers
Cuala hurlers